Mark L. Young (born Markell V. Efimoff (Russian: Маркелл В. Ефимофф) January 1, 1991) is an American actor. He attended La Salle University in the United States.

Early life 
Markell V. Efimoff (Russian: Маркелл В. Ефимофф) born in Everett, Washington, of Russian descent. He has a fraternal twin Arthur and an older sister Arlaris.

Young began acting at the age of nine and moved to Los Angeles when he was 12 to pursue his career. His first significant on-screen credit was a small role in two episodes of the HBO series Six Feet Under.

Career 
Young's other notable appearances include television shows The Comeback, The OC, Dexter, Big Love, Childrens Hospital, Heroes, Secret Life of the American Teenager, Cold Case, ER, CSI: Crime Scene Investigation and The Inbetweeners, while his film credits include Sex Drive, Happiness Runs, The Lucky Ones, We're the Millers, and Tammy.

Filmography

Film

Television

References

External links 

1991 births
Living people
People from Everett, Washington
American male child actors
American male film actors
American male television actors
Male actors from Washington (state)
21st-century American male actors
American people of Russian descent